Chameleon is a 1974 big band jazz album by Canadian jazz trumpeter Maynard Ferguson. It features cover versions of many songs that were popular in the years leading up to its production, including: "Jet" by Paul McCartney and Wings, "The Way We Were" – which was popularized by Barbra Streisand, and "Livin' for the City" by Stevie Wonder. He also pays tribute to trumpeter Bunny Berigan with his own take on "I Can't Get Started".

Reviews 

Writing for the All Music Guide to Jazz, Scott Yanow said of the album that "His version of Herbie Hancock's "Chameleon" is enjoyable, and he does a good job on Chick Corea's "La Fiesta".

Reissues 
Chameleon was reissued on CD by Sony on July 1, 2003 in the U.S. with the album "Conquistador" paired with it as a double re-release and contains remastered sound as well as an extended essay within the 12-page liner booklet.

Track listing

Musicians 
 Maynard Ferguson – Leader, trumpet, baritone horn, superbone and vocal.
 Stan Mark, Dennis Noday, Lynn Nicholson, Bob Summers – trumpets, flugelhorn, Latin American instruments
 Randy Purcell, Jerry Johnson – trombones
 Andy Mackintosh – alto sax, flute, soprano, cowbell
 Brian Smith – tenor sax, flute, tambourine
 Bruce Johnstone – baritone sax, flute, vibraslap
 Rick Petrone – Bass
 Allan Zavod – piano, electric piano
 Dan D'Imperio - drums
 Joe Beck - guitar
 Jerry Johnson - trombone, played all bass trombone parts using "false-pedaltones" on a 2B, arranged La Fiesta

Production 
 Teo Macero –Producer
 Stan Tonkel –Recording Engineer
 John Guerriere, Tim Geelan –Re-Mix Engineers
 Jack Ashkinazy –Mastering Engineer
 Karenlee Grant –Cover Design
 Frank Laffitte –Cover photographs
 Ernie Garside –Sleeve notes, contracting-co-ordination

References 

1974 albums
Albums produced by Teo Macero
Big band albums
Columbia Records albums
Maynard Ferguson albums